Laelius is a name that can refer to:

People
Gaius Laelius, a Roman statesman, who was consul in 190 BC and friend of Scipio Africanus
Gaius Laelius Sapiens (consul of 140 BC), a Roman statesman, son of the above, who was consul in 140 BC, and was friend to Scipio's adoptive grandson Scipio Aemilianus
Decimus Laelius (tribune of the plebs 54 BC), one of the prosecutors Cicero opposed in the defense speech Pro Flacco
Laelius Socinus, a 16th-century humanist and reformer

Literature
Laelius de Amicitia, a philosophical dialog by Cicero on friendship, which is based on the second Gaius Laelius and his relationships with various great men
Sir Robert Pipon Marett, a Jersey poet who used the pen name Laelius

Biology
Laelius (wasp), genus of wasp from the subfamily Epyrinae, family Bethylidae